The 1927–28 season was the 55th season of competitive football in Scotland and the 38th season of the Scottish Football League.

Scottish League Division One 

Champions: Rangers
Relegated: Boness United, Dunfermline Athletic

Scottish League Division Two 

Promoted: Ayr United, Third Lanark

Scottish Cup 

Rangers were winners of the Scottish Cup after a 4–0 win over the previous year's winners, Celtic.

Other honours

National

County 

. * replay

Highland League

Junior Cup 
Maryhill Hibs were winners of the Junior Cup after a 6–2 win over Burnbank Athletic in the final.

Scotland national team 

Key:

Notes and references

External links 
 Scottish Football Historical Archive

 
Seasons in Scottish football